Elisabeth Ingrid Ljunggren-Morris (born 26 February 1948) is a retired Swedish freestyle swimmer won a bronze medal over 400 m at the 1962 European Aquatics Championships. She competed at the 1964 and 1968 Summer Olympics in the 400 m, 800 m and 4 × 100 m relay with the best achievement of eighth place over 400 m in 1968.

References

1948 births
Swedish female freestyle swimmers
Swimmers at the 1964 Summer Olympics
Swimmers at the 1968 Summer Olympics
Living people
Olympic swimmers of Sweden
European Aquatics Championships medalists in swimming
SK Neptun swimmers
Swimmers from Stockholm